is a railway station in the city of Nihonmatsu, Fukushima Prefecture, Japan operated by East Japan Railway Company (JR East).

Lines

Station layout
The station has one island platform connected to the station building by a footbridge. The station is staffed.

Platforms

History
Adachi Station opened on July 11, 1917. The station was absorbed into the JR East network upon the privatization of the Japanese National Railways (JNR) on April 1, 1987.

Passenger statistics
In fiscal 2018, the station was used by an average of 787 passengers daily (boarding passengers only).

Surrounding area
Adachi Post Office
Adachi Chamber of Commerce
former Adachi Town Hall

See also
 List of railway stations in Japan

External links

References

Stations of East Japan Railway Company
Railway stations in Fukushima Prefecture
Tōhoku Main Line
Railway stations in Japan opened in 1917
Nihonmatsu, Fukushima